Delec platform is a unused railway employee only platform located on the eastern side of Enfield Yard, on the Campsie-Flemington Goods Line in Sydney, Australia. Prior to Enfield Yard being remodelled in 1996, Delec was on the Up Main Line.

Both the New Up and Down main lines now run on the western side of Enfield Yard. The Station and Up Main closed in 1996 with the line now a shunting neck for Weston Flour Mill.

The platform served the adjacent Delec Locomotive Depot. This facility closed in August 2008.

Neighbouring stations 
The former Hope Street Platform was located up from Delec.

References

Disused railway stations in Sydney
Railway stations in Australia opened in 1957
Railway stations closed in 1996
1996 disestablishments in Australia